The 1988–89 WHL season was the 23rd season for the Western Hockey League. Fourteen teams completed a 72-game season. The Swift Current Broncos won the President's Cup before going on to win the Memorial Cup.

League notes 
 The New Westminster Bruins relocated to Kennewick, Washington to become the Tri-City Americans.

Regular season

Final standings

Scoring leaders 
Note: GP = Games played; G = Goals; A = Assists; Pts = Points; PIM = Penalties in minutes

1989 WHL Playoffs

First round 
 Swift Current earned a bye
 Saskatoon earned a bye
 Lethbridge defeated Prince Albert 3 games to 1
 Moose Jaw defeated Medicine Hat 3 games to 0

Division semi-finals 
 Swift Current defeated Moose Jaw 4 games to 0
 Saskatoon defeated Lethbridge 4 games to 0
 Portland defeated Tri-City 5 games to 2
 Kamloops defeated Victoria 5 games to 3

Division finals 
 Swift Current defeated Saskatoon 4 games to 0
 Portland defeated Kamloops 5 games to 3

WHL Championship 
 Swift Current defeated Portland 4 games to 0

All-Star game 

On January 24, the West Division defeated the East Division 5–1 at Brandon, Manitoba before a crowd of 2,933.

WHL awards

All-Star Teams

See also 
 1989 Memorial Cup
 1989 NHL Entry Draft
 1988 in sports
 1989 in sports

References 
 whl.ca
 2005–06 WHL Guide

Western Hockey League seasons
WHL
WHL